The Sarasota metropolitan area is a metropolitan area located in Southwest Florida. The metropolitan area is defined by the Office of Management and Budget as the North Port–Sarasota–Bradenton metropolitan statistical area as a metropolitan statistical area (MSA) consisting of Manatee County and Sarasota County. The largest cities in the MSA are North Port, Sarasota, and Bradenton. At the 2020 census, the MSA had a population of 833,716.

The federal government defines the North Port–Sarasota combined statistical area as a combined statistical area (CSA) consisting of the combination of the North Port–Sarasota–Bradenton MSA, the Punta Gorda, Florida MSA (Charlotte County), and the Arcadia, Florida, micropolitan statistical area (DeSoto County). At the 2020 census, the CSA had a population of 1,054,539.

History of the metropolitan area designations 
The Sarasota standard metropolitan statistical area (SMSA) was first defined in 1973, and included only Sarasota County. The Bradenton SMSA was defined after the 1980 United States census, and included only Manatee County. The two MSAs were combined in 1993 as the Sarasota–Bradenton metropolitan statistical area. Venice was added as a principal city after the 2000 census. In 2007, the MSA was renamed the Bradenton–Sarasota–Venice MSA because Bradenton's population then exceeded that of Sarasota. In 2009, the area was designated the North Port–Bradenton–Sarasota MSA after North Port qualified as a "principal city" under the metropolitan statistical area definition and was determined to be the largest of the area's three principal cities. As of 2013, the MSA was renamed to its current name: North Port–Sarasota–Bradenton metropolitan statistical area.

The North Port–Sarasota–Bradenton MSA is a component of the larger North Port–Sarasota combined statistical area (CSA), which also includes the Punta Gorda, Florida MSA, and the Arcadia, Florida, micropolitan statistical area (μSA).

Demographics

Counties

Cities

Largest cities
The following is a list of the five largest cities in the Sarasota metropolitan area as ranked by population.

Other cities and towns

Census designated places 
The following is a list of census-designated places (CDPs) ranked by population. CDPs in the combined statistical area are included.

Climate
The Sarasota metropolitan area, like most of Florida, is located in the humid subtropical zone (Köppen climate classification: Cfa), closely bordering on a tropical climate like Southern Florida. There are hot, humid summers with frequent afternoon thunderstorms and relatively drier and mild winters.

Transportation

Roads

Freeways 

  Interstate 75
  Interstate 275

U.S. highways 

  U.S. Route 19
  U.S. Route 41
  U.S. Route 301

State roads 

 State Road 37
 State Road 62
 State Road 64
 State Road 70
 State Road 72
 State Road 681
 State Road 684
 State Road 758
 State Road 776
 State Road 777
 State Road 780
 State Road 789

County roads 
List of county roads in Charlotte County, Florida
List of county roads in DeSoto County, Florida
List of county roads in Manatee County, Florida
List of county roads in Sarasota County, Florida

Ports 

 SeaPort Manatee

Airports 

 Sarasota-Bradenton International Airport

Public airports 

Buchan Airport
Venice Municipal Airport

Public transportation 

Both Sarasota and Manatee counties have their own transit networks, SCAT and MCAT, which runs bus services in the area. Amtrak does operate a Thruway Route going through the area starting in St. Petersburg-Clearwater and ending in Fort Myers, with Sarasota and Ellenton operating as stops along the route.

Media

Newspapers 
 Anna Maria Island Sun
 Bradenton Herald
 Business Observer, a business newspaper that is published in Sarasota, but serves several other regions of Florida.
 East County Observer
 Longboat Observer
 The Bradenton Times, an online newspaper.
 The Islander
 Sarasota Herald-Tribune
 Siesta Key Observer
 Sarasota Observer
Tempo News
Venice Gondolier Sun

Magazines 

 Sarasota Magazine
 SRQ Magazine
Venice: Gulf Coast Living Magazine

Television 
 ABC 7
 WSNN (SNN)

Radio 

 WBRD
 WCTQ
 WDIZ (AM)
 WHPT
 WJIS
 WKDW-LP
 WKES
 WLSS
 WRUB (FM)
 WSDV
 WSLR-LP
 WSMR (FM)
 WSRQ (AM)
 WTMY
 WWPR (AM)

Education 
Public education is provided by Manatee County School District and Sarasota County Public Schools.

Colleges and universities 
The following college/university campuses exist in the metropolitan area.

 Asolo Conservatory for Actor Training
 East West College of Natural Medicine
 Everglades University
 Florida State University College of Medicine
 Keiser University
 LECOM
 Ringling College of Art and Design
 New College of Florida
 State College of Florida Sarasota-Manatee
 USF Sarasota-Manatee

Economy 
The Sarasota Metropolitan Area has a gross metropolitan product of $34.3 billion as of 2018.

Recreation and culture

Parks/nature reserves

Federally owned 
DeSoto National Memorial

State owned 

 Lake Manatee State Park
 Myakka River State Park
 Oscar Scherer State Park
 Terra Ceia Preserve

Museums 

 Bishop Museum of Science and Nature
 Florida Maritime Museum
Florida Railroad Museum
John and Mable Ringling Museum of Art
 Palmetto Historical Park
Sarasota Classic Car Museum

Theatres 

 Florida Studio Theatre
 Sarasota Opera House
 Van Wezel Performing Arts Hall

See also
 Manatee County, Florida
 Sarasota County, Florida
 Southwest Florida
 Tampa Bay Area

References

External links
Metropolitan and micropolitan statistical area definitions

 
Sarasota, Florida
Bradenton, Florida
Venice, Florida
North Port, Florida
Manatee County, Florida
Sarasota County, Florida
South Florida
Central Florida
1973 establishments in Florida